The 1941 Iowa State Cyclones football team was an American football team that represented Iowa State College of Agricultural and Mechanic Arts (later renamed Iowa State University) in the Big Six Conference during the 1941 college football season. In their first season under head coach Ray Donels, the Cyclones compiled a 2–6–1 record (0–4–1) against conference opponents), finished in last place in the conference, and were outscored by a total of 173 to 85. They played their home games at Clyde Williams Field in Ames, Iowa.

Senior guard LaVerne "Butch" Lewis was the team captain; Lewis was also selected by the United Press as a second-team player on the 1941 All-Big Six Conference football team. No Iowa State player was selected as a first-team all-conference player.

Schedule

References

Iowa State
Iowa State Cyclones football seasons
Iowa State Cyclones football